Now! is an album by jazz vibraphonist Bobby Hutcherson, released on the Blue Note label. The album is the first of Hutcherson's to feature vocals, contributed by Gene McDaniels and a chorus. The CD reissue includes four tracks recorded live at the Hollywood Bowl, in 1977.

Track listing
"Slow Change" (Hutcherson, McDaniels) - 7:17
"Hello to the Wind" (Chambers, McDaniels) - 5:59
"Now" (Hutcherson, McDaniels) - 2:46
"The Creators" (Herbie Lewis) - 12:35
"Black Heroes" (Harold Land) - 7:06

Bonus tracks on CD:
"Slow Change" (Hutcherson, McDaniels) - 5:05
"Now" (Hutcherson, McDaniels) - 2:49
"Hello to the Wind" (Chambers, McDaniels) - 3:08
"Now" [Reprise] (Hutcherson, McDaniels) - 1:43

Personnel
Tracks 2-3
Bobby Hutcherson - vibraphone, marimba
Harold Land - tenor saxophone
Kenny Barron - piano
Wally Richardson - guitar
Herbie Lewis - bass
Joe Chambers - drums
Candido Camero - congas
Gene McDaniels- lead vocals
Hilda Harris, Albertine M. Robinson, Christine Spencer - backing vocals
Recorded at A & R Studios, New York on October 3, 1969.

Tracks 1, 4-5
Bobby Hutcherson - vibes
Harold Land - tenor saxophone
Stanley Cowell - piano, electric piano
Wally Richardson - guitar
Herbie Lewis - bass
Joe Chambers - drums
Candido Camero - congas, bongo
Gene McDaniels - lead vocals
Eileen Gilbert, Christine Spencer, Maeretha Stewart - backing vocals
Recorded at A & R Studios, New York on November 5, 1969.

Tracks 6-9
Bobby Hutcherson - vibes
Manny Boyd - tenor sax, soprano sax
George Cables - piano
James Leary - bass
Eddie Marshall - drums
Bobbye Hall Porter - percussion
Dale Oehler - arranger
Los Angeles Philharmonic conducted by Calvin Simmons
Recorded live at the Hollywood Bowl, Los Angeles on August 13, 1977.

References 

1970 albums
Blue Note Records albums
Bobby Hutcherson albums
Hard bop albums
Post-bop albums
Avant-garde jazz albums
Albums produced by Duke Pearson
Albums conducted by Calvin E. Simmons